Caelostomus anthracinus is a species of ground beetle in the subfamily Pterostichinae. It was described by Johann Christoph Friedrich Klug in 1833.

References

Caelostomus
Beetles described in 1833